Dean Paul is an American football coach. He is the head football coach at Ohio Northern University in Ada, Ohio, a position he has held since 2004.  Paul served in the same capacity at Thomas More College in Crestview Hills, Kentucky from 1999 to 2003.  A native of Garrettsville, Ohio, he played college football as a running back at Mount Union College—now known as the University of Mount Union—from 1987 to 1990.

Head coaching record

References

External links
 Ohio Northern profile

Year of birth missing (living people)
Living people
Allegheny Gators football coaches
Fordham Rams football coaches
Mount Union Purple Raiders football players
Ohio Northern Polar Bears football coaches
Thomas More Saints football coaches
Tulane Green Wave football coaches
Wooster Fighting Scots football coaches
People from Garrettsville, Ohio